NK Slavija Pleternica is a Croatian football club based in the town of Pleternica near Požega in Slavonia. Slavija is currently playing in Treća HNL Istok (Third division east)

Association football clubs established in 1926
Football clubs in Croatia
Football clubs in Požega-Slavonia County
1926 establishments in Croatia